Ashton Dumar Norwill Simmonds (born April 5, 1995), known professionally as Daniel Caesar, is a Canadian singer and songwriter. After independently building a following through the release of two critically acclaimed EPs, Praise Break (2014) and Pilgrim's Paradise (2015), Caesar released his debut studio album, Freudian, in August 2017, which garnered widespread critical acclaim. He released his second studio album, Case Study 01, in June 2019. In March 2021, Caesar was featured alongside Giveon on Justin Bieber's single "Peaches", which serves as his first number-one song on the US Billboard Hot 100.

Life and career 
Ashton Dumar Norwill Simmonds was born on April 5, 1995, in the Scarborough district of Toronto, Ontario, and raised in Oshawa. He is the second eldest of four children to his mother Hollace and father Norwill Simmonds, a pastor and gospel singer who released his first album as a high school student in Jamaica. Caesar attended the Seventh-day Adventist Church and private school in Oshawa. He is of Bajan and Jamaican descent.

Caesar grew up in church, singing before his father's congregation in Oshawa. He was raised listening to soul and gospel delivered through musicality and religion, even though his parents were cautious of temptations that came with music. Caesar longed for the city, which was an hour’s drive from his home. 

At the age of 17, Caesar was kicked out of the house after a fight with his father on the weekend of his high school graduation; he was briefly homeless during this time. He felt no choice but to pursue his calling as a musician. After leaving his home, he began doing gigs. He connected with producers and future collaborators Jordan Evans and Matthew Burnett and began writing and recording what would be his debut EP Praise Break in 2014; it was  No. 19 on the "20 Best R&B Albums of 2014" by Rolling Stone and the top projects of 2014 by Noisey Canada.

Caesar's career gained notability in 2015, with the release of his second EP, Pilgrim's Paradise. The album received positive critical acclaim and, while not immediately a commercial success, tracks like the cover "Streetlights" became sleeper hits.

On August 25, 2017, Caesar released his debut album Freudian, which includes the singles "Get You", "We Find Love", and "Blessed". The album was a shortlisted finalist for the 2018 Polaris Music Prize. At the 60th Annual Grammy Awards, Caesar received two nominations for Best R&B Album and Best R&B Performance for "Get You". At the 61st Annual Grammy Awards, Caesar won Best R&B Performance for his single "Best Part". On March 19, 2021, Caesar was also featured alongside American singer-songwriter Giveon on fellow Canadian singer Justin Bieber's single "Peaches", from the latter's sixth studio album, Justice, which became his first chart-topping single on the US Billboard Hot 100.

Artistry 
Caesar's music is influenced by soul and gospel. His music draws from his childhood experiences and integrates them with R&B and electronics, while his lyrics explore subjects of religion, philosophy and unrequited love. In his music, he often references concepts of philosophy. His singing voice reshapes itself on each track, often veering into a hushed, introspective lilting style. According to Caesar, "In my religious surroundings growing up, the point is to be still, to direct as little attention to yourself as possible and instead, direct all attention to what you’re saying. Now, it’s kind of the opposite." Caesar cites Frank Ocean, Kanye West, Beyoncé, and The Doors frontman Jim Morrison as musical and stylistic inspirations.

Caesar works in close collaboration with producers Matthew Burnett and Jordan Evans, with whom he co-founded his independent label, Golden Child Recordings, and has co-produced almost all of his music with since 2015. Caesar is also part of an informal collaborative of Toronto-based musicians and songwriters that includes River Tiber, BadBadNotGood, and Charlotte Day Wilson, among others.

Controversy 

In April 2018, Caesar retweeted and then deleted tweets from conservative Candace Owens. He noted that he did not want to "martyr" for the tweets and that people should hear opposing arguments. He later clarified his comments and apologized for any misunderstandings.

Also in April 2018, Caesar did not credit Jeremy Passion's "Lemonade" for lyrics to his song "Best Part" (with H.E.R.). 

In March 2019, Caesar defended his friend Julieanna Goddard via an Instagram live stream. Goddard had been criticized for her insensitive comments on race, particularly those regarding black women. Caesar came to her defense, asking why some black people were "being so mean," and called call out culture overly sensitive. His comments were received negatively by some on social media. Caesar later apologized for the way he gave his opinions, saying: "I was talking down to you guys. I apologize for how I expressed my idea, [t]here was no one there to challenge my ideas. That’s also dangerous. That’s why it’s tyrannical... that is where I went wrong. I believe in what I said. A real man can admit when he’s wrong. I can admit when I’m wrong."

Discography 

 Freudian (2017)
 Case Study 01 (2019)
 Never Enough (2023)

Awards and nominations

BET Awards 

! scope="col" class="unsortable" |
|-
| 2017
| rowspan="3"|Himself
| International Viewers' Choice Award
| 
|
|-
|rowspan="2" | 2018
| Best Male R&B/Pop Artist
| 
|rowspan="2" |
|-
| Best New Artist
| 
|}

Grammy Awards 

! scope="col" class="unsortable" |
|-
|rowspan="2" | 2018
| Freudian
| Best R&B Album
| 
|rowspan="2" |
|-
| "Get You" 
|rowspan="3" |Best R&B Performance
| 
|-
|2019
|"Best Part" 
| 
|
|-
|2020
|"Love Again" 
| 
| rowspan="6"|
|-
| rowspan="5"|2022
| Justice (as featured artist and songwriter)
| Album of the Year
| 
|-
| rowspan="4"|"Peaches" (with Justin Bieber and Giveon)
| Record of the Year
| 
|-
| Song of the Year
| 
|-
| Best R&B Performance
| 
|-
| Best Music Video
| 
|-
|}

iHeartRadio Much Music Video Awards 

! scope="col" class="unsortable" |
|-
| 2017
| Himself
| Best New Canadian Artist
| 
|
|}

iHeartRadio Music Awards 

! scope="col" class="unsortable" |
|-
| 2019
| Himself
| R&B Artist of the Year
| 
|
|-
| rowspan=3|2022
| rowspan=3|"Peaches"
| Song of the Year
| 
| rowspan=3|
|-
| Best Collaboration
| 
|-
| Best Music Video
| 
|}

Juno Awards 

! scope="col" class="unsortable" |
|-
| 2017
| Pilgrim's Paradise
| R&B/Soul Recording of the Year
| 
|
|-
|rowspan="2"|2018
| Himself
| Artist of the Year
| 
|rowspan="2"|
|-
| Freudian
| rowspan="2"|R&B/Soul Recording of the Year
| 
|-
| 2020
| "Case Study 01"
| 
|
|-
| 2022
| "Peaches" 
| Single of the Year
| 
| 
|-
| 2023
| "Please Do Not Lean" (feat. BadBadNotGood)
| Traditional R&B/Soul Recording of the Year
| 
| 
|}

MTV Video Music Awards 

! scope="col" class="unsortable" |
|-
| rowspan=4|2021
| rowspan=4|"Peaches"
| Best Pop
| 
| rowspan=4|
|-
| Best Collaboration
| 
|-
| Best Editing
| 
|-
| Song of Summer
| 
|}

Polaris Music Prize 

! scope="col" class="unsortable" |
|-
| 2016
| Pilgrim's Paradise
| rowspan="3"| Polaris Music Prize
|  
|
|-
|2018
| Freudian
|  
|
|-
|2020
| Case Study 01
|  
|
|}

SOCAN Songwriting Prize

Soul Train Music Awards 

! scope="col" class="unsortable" |
|-
| rowspan="5"|2018
| rowspan="2"|Himself
| Best New Artist
| 
| rowspan="5"|
|-
| Best R&B/Soul Male Artist
| 
|-
| "Broken Clocks"
| rowspan="2"|The Ashford And Simpson Songwriter's Award
| 
|-
| rowspan="2"|"Best Part"
| 
|-
| Best Collaboration Performance
| 
|-
| rowspan="2"|2019
| rowspan="2"|Himself
| Soul Train Certified Award
| 
| rowspan="2"|
|-
| Best R&B/Soul Male Artist
| 
|-
|}

Other awards

Concert tours 
Headlining
Freudian, a World Tour (2017–18)
Case Study 01: Tour (2019)

References

External links 
 
 

1995 births
Living people
Canadian people of Barbadian descent
Canadian people of Jamaican descent
Canadian contemporary R&B singers
Canadian songwriters
Grammy Award winners
Musicians from Toronto
Alternative R&B musicians
Juno Award for R&B/Soul Recording of the Year winners
Writers from Toronto
21st-century Black Canadian male singers